WSC may refer to:

Organizations

Business
 WSC (cyclecar), a Scottish automobile manufacturer
 WSC (radio station), a defunct marine coast station in Massachusetts and New Jersey, US
 Wesco Financial, a financial corporation (stock symbol WSC)
 World Shipping Council, an industry group
 World Standards Cooperation, an alliance of the IEC, ISO and ITU international standardization organizations

Sports clubs
 Washington Sports Clubs, a division of New York City-based TSI Holdings
 Wiener Sportclub, an athletics club in Vienna

Other organizations
 Weinheimer Senioren-Convent, a German student association
 Westminster Seminary California, a Reformed and Presbyterian Christian graduate school
 Wild Salmon Center, an international conservation organization
 World Scout Conference, a world conference of scouting organizations
 World Sindhi Congress, a non-profit Sindhi advocacy organisation
 World Standards Cooperation, an alliance of the IEC, ISO and ITU international standardization organizations
 World Statistics Congress, a professional association of statisticians

Science and technology
 West Spitsbergen Current, an ocean current
 Western Science Center,  a museum in Hemet, California
 White Sands Complex, a government facility in New Mexico, US
 Winograd Schema Challenge, an AI challenge
 WonderSwan Color, a handheld game console

Sport and competition

 When Saturday Comes, an association football magazine
 World Scholar's Cup, an international team academic competition
 World Scrabble Championship
 World Series Cricket
 World Snooker Championship
 World Sports Car, a prototype class in the IMSA GT Championship
 World Sportscar Championship
 World Sudoku Championship
 World Solar Challenge, a solar-powered car race
 WorldSkills Competition, an international vocational skill competition

Other uses
 Weekly Shōnen Champion, a Japanese manga magazine
 Winston Spencer Churchill, British Prime Minister
 Wardell Stephen Curry II, American professional basketball player